The 5.6×57mmR  (designated as the 6,5 × 57 R by the C.I.P.) cartridge was created by Rheinisch-Westfälische Sprengstoffwerke (RWS) in Germany for hunting small deer.

5.6×57mm rimless variant
The 5.6×57mm (designated as the 5,6 × 57 by the C.I.P.) is a rimless variant of the 5.6×57mmR. The rimmed variant was designed for break-open rifles and is almost identical to the rimless variant except for the rim.

Ballistics
 Loads:
 74 gr @ 1040 m/s (3380 ft/s)
 60 gr @ 3700 ft/s

References

Pistol and rifle cartridges
Rimmed cartridges